John Bock (born February 11, 1971, in Crystal Lake, Illinois) is a former professional American football player who played offensive lineman for six seasons for the New York Jets and Miami Dolphins. Bock served as Florida Atlantic University's offensive line coach from 2002 until 2004. He became the head coach for the Brooklyn Bolts in the FXFL during its inaugural season, for which he was named Coach of the Year for leading the Bolts to the league championship. Bock did not return to the FXFL for 2015.

References

External links 
 
Bock is Pushing to Start at Right Guard
Parents have dilemma on allowing kids to play youth football

1971 births
Living people
American football centers
American football offensive guards
American football offensive tackles
Amsterdam Admirals players
Indiana State Sycamores football players
Louisville Cardinals football players
Buffalo Bills players
Miami Dolphins players
New York Jets players
People from Crystal Lake, Illinois
Fall Experimental Football League coaches
Florida Atlantic Owls football coaches